"Don't Let Me Down" is a song by the English rock band the Beatles, recorded in 1969 during the Let It Be sessions. It was written by John Lennon and credited to the Lennon–McCartney songwriting partnership. The band recorded the song with keyboardist Billy Preston; the single release with "Get Back" was credited to "the Beatles with Billy Preston". Originally released as a B-side, producer Phil Spector excluded the song from Let It Be. However, it was eventually included on an alternate mix of the album, Let It Be... Naked.

Composition
Written by John Lennon as an anguished love song to Yoko Ono, it was interpreted by Paul McCartney as a "genuine plea", with Lennon saying to Ono, "I'm really stepping out of line on this one. I'm really just letting my vulnerability be seen, so you must not let me down."

It grew (like "Sun King") from the Fm7–E changes from Fleetwood Mac's "Albatross" with McCartney arranging instrumental and vocal parts and George Harrison adding a descending two-part lead guitar accompaniment to the verse and a countermelody in the bridge. Alan W. Pollack states that "the counterpoint melody played in octaves during the Alternate Verse by the bass and lead guitars is one of the more novel, unusual instrumental touches you'll find anywhere in the Beatles catalogue."

Recording and release

Multiple versions of "Don't Let Me Down" were recorded by the Beatles during the Get Back (Let It Be) recording sessions. The version recorded on 28 January 1969, with vocal overdubs in late February, was released as a B-side to the single "Get Back", recorded the same day. "Get Back" reached number one and "Don't Let Me Down" reached number 35 on the US Billboard Hot 100.
When the "Get Back" project was revisited, Phil Spector dropped "Don't Let Me Down" from the Let It Be (1970) album.

The Beatles performed "Don't Let Me Down" twice during their rooftop concert of 30 January 1969, and the first performance was included in the Let It Be (1970) film, directed by Michael Lindsay-Hogg. In November 2003, a composite edit of the two rooftop versions was released on Let It Be... Naked. Both versions were seen in the 2022 film The Beatles: Get Back - The Rooftop Concert.

The B-side version of the song was included on the Beatles' compilations Hey Jude, 1967–1970 and Past Masters Volume 2 and Mono Masters. The same recording also appears on the soundtrack to the 1988 documentary, Imagine: John Lennon.

Reception
Richie Unterberger of AllMusic called it "one of the Beatles' most powerful love songs", Stephen Thomas Erlewine of AllMusic described the song as "heart-wrenching soul" and Roy Carr and Tony Tyler called it "a superb sobber from misery-expert J. W. O. Lennon, MBE. And still one of the most highly underrated Beatle underbellies." Author Ian MacDonald praised "Don't Let Me Down" and declared that "this track vies with 'Come Together' for consideration as the best of Lennon's late-style Beatles records". “Don’t Let Me Down” is the most viewed video on the Beatles’ YouTube channel, with over 400 million views.

Cover versions
 In 1992, Annie Lennox covered the song. A studio recording appeared as a b-side to the single Walking on Broken Glass (released in August 1992), a live version from the Montreux Jazz Festival for MTV Unplugged has been released as a b-side to the single Cold (pt. 3 "Coldest") in October 1992.

Personnel
 John Lennon – lead vocal, rhythm guitars
 Paul McCartney – bass guitar, harmony vocal
 George Harrison – lead guitar, backing vocal
 Ringo Starr – drums
 Billy Preston – electric piano

Personnel per Ian MacDonald

No official producer's credit was included for the single release owing to "the confused roles of George Martin and Glyn Johns". However the 1967-1970 compilation liner notes credited Martin as the song's producer.

Charts

Notes

References

External links
 

The Beatles songs
1969 singles
Songs written by Lennon–McCartney
Annie Lennox songs
Apple Records singles
Song recordings produced by Glyn Johns
Song recordings produced by George Martin
Songs published by Northern Songs
1969 songs
Songs about Yoko Ono
British soul songs
Blue-eyed soul songs